Mikhail Valeryevich Voronov (born 22 September 1976) is a former Russian football player.

While playing for FC Neftekhimik Nizhnekamsk, Voronov scored two goals during the 2002 Russian First Division season.

References

External links
 

1976 births
Sportspeople from Krasnodar
Living people
Russian footballers
FC Rostov players
Russian Premier League players
FC Volgar Astrakhan players
FC Kuban Krasnodar players
FC Fakel Voronezh players
FC Dynamo Stavropol players
FC Chernomorets Novorossiysk players
FC Neftekhimik Nizhnekamsk players
Association football midfielders
FC Sodovik Sterlitamak players
FC Spartak-UGP Anapa players